Nodaway County Courthouse, is a historic courthouse located at Maryville, Nodaway County, Missouri. It was designed by the architectural firm Eckel & Mann. Construction began in 1882, but it was not completed and ready for occupancy until the spring of 1883.  It is a two-story, High Victorian Italianate style rectangular brick building.  It measures approximately 111 feet, 6 inches, long and 76 feet wide.  It has a truncated hipped roof with massive cornice.  It features a tower, recessed portico, and ornamental stonework.

It was listed on the National Register of Historic Places in 1979.

References

County courthouses in Missouri
Courthouses on the National Register of Historic Places in Missouri
Italianate architecture in Missouri
Government buildings completed in 1881
Buildings and structures in Nodaway County, Missouri
National Register of Historic Places in Nodaway County, Missouri